Brynica (German: Brinitz) is a river in Silesia, Poland. It has a length of 55 km and is the main tributary of Czarna Przemsza. It has a source in Mysłów, and flows through Piekary Śląskie, Wojkowice, Czeladź, Siemianowice Śląskie, Świerklaniec, Katowice, Sosnowiec and finally Mysłowice where it joins Czarna Przemsza.

Rivers of Poland
Rivers of Silesian Voivodeship